Marshall's Bridge is a historic stone arch bridge located in East Brandywine Township, Chester County, Pennsylvania. It spans Culbertson Run and is right next to Bridge Mill Farm. The bridge was constructed in 1903 of stone with brick arch rings.

It was listed on the National Register of Historic Places in 1988.

References 
 

Road bridges on the National Register of Historic Places in Pennsylvania
Bridges completed in 1903
Bridges in Chester County, Pennsylvania
National Register of Historic Places in Chester County, Pennsylvania
Stone arch bridges in the United States
1903 establishments in Pennsylvania